Magnus Jøndal (born 7 February 1988) is a former Norwegian handball player, who last played for SG Flensburg-Handewitt and the Norwegian national team.

He competed at the 2016 European Men's Handball Championship.

Honours
World Championship:
: 2017, 2019
 European Championship:
: 2020

Individual awards
All-Star Left Wing of the World Championship: 2019
All-Star Left Wing of the European Championship: 2020

References

External links
 
 Magnus Jøndal at the Norwegian Handball Federation 
 
 

1988 births
Living people
Norwegian male handball players
People from Hobøl
Expatriate handball players
Norwegian expatriate sportspeople in Denmark
Norwegian expatriate sportspeople in Germany
Handball-Bundesliga players
SG Flensburg-Handewitt players
Handball players at the 2020 Summer Olympics
Sportspeople from Viken (county)
Olympic handball players of Norway